Oskanluy-e Olya (also Romanized as Oskānlūy-e  ‘Olyā; also known as Qarah Īdī and Oskānlū-ye Bālā) is a village in Bastamlu Rural District, in the Central District of Khoda Afarin County, East Azerbaijan Province, Iran. At the 2006 census, its population was 473, in 84 families.

References 

Populated places in Khoda Afarin County